The King's American Dragoons were a British provincial military unit, raised for Loyalist service during the American Revolutionary War.  They were founded by Colonel Benjamin Thompson, later Count Rumford, in 1781. They were initially formed from the remnants of other British Loyalist units, including Black Loyalist soldiers.

The King's American Dragoons primarily served on Long Island in 1782 and early 1783, where they earned local notoriety for destroying a church and burial ground in order to erect Fort Golgotha in Huntington.

They were evacuated from New York and resettled in Saint John, New Brunswick, in July 1783.  They were disbanded there in October.

References

Loyalist military units in the American Revolution